Platinum Weddings is an American reality television series which premiered on July 23, 2006, on the WE tv cable channel. The series chronicles the lives of couples who are planning their upcoming lavish weddings. The series spawned one spin-off series, Amazing Wedding Cakes.

References

External links
 

2000s American reality television series
2006 American television series debuts
2010s American reality television series
2010 American television series endings
Wedding television shows